Iran and Turkmenistan share a common border of more than 1000km. Since Turkmenistan's independence from the Soviet Union in 1991, the two countries have enjoyed good relations and have cooperated in economic, transportation, infrastructure development, and energy sectors. The two nations have strong historic ties.

Trade 

Iran has the largest volume of trade exchange with Turkmenistan after Russia. The Tajan-Mashhad-Sarakhs railroad, the $139 million Korpeje-Kurt Kui gas pipeline in western Turkmenistan and the $167 million Dousti ('Friendship' in Persian) Dam in the south of the country were built through a joint venture. Balkanabad-Aliabad power transfer line and several other projects such as the program of fiber-optic communications development, construction of bunkers and other objects in Merve and a refinery in Turkmenbashi, construction of liquefied gas terminals, highways are instances of growing bilateral relations. In 2009 about 100 industrial projects have been built or are being built in Turkmenistan with Iranian help.

Annual trade turnover decreased to $1.2 billion in 2009 from $3.2 billion in 2008 mostly because of decrease in the price of oil and gas. Turkmenistan's exports to Iran increased by 42 percent during January–September 2007. Turkmenistan's main exports to Iran were natural gas, oil and petrochemical products, as well as textiles. Turkmenistan sold 8 billion cubic meters of gas to Iran in 2010 from 5.8 bcm in 2005. Turkmenistan normally supplies 5 percent of Iran's gas demand. Both countries inaugurated the Dauletabad–Sarakhs–Khangiran pipeline in 2010 to raise natural gas supplies to Iran to 20 billion cubic meters a year.

November 28, 2021, Iran, Turkmenistan and Azerbaijan have signed a gas swap deal for up to 2 billion cubic metres, per year.Turkmenistan will sell 5-6 million cubic metres of gas per day to Azerbaijan under the trilateral agreement signed in Turkmenistan.Iran will also withdraw its gas consumption needs in five provinces of the country from the right to transfer this gas. Iran was moving to resolve a lingering gas debt dispute with Central Asia's Turkmenistan, which said in late 2017 that it was owed $1.8 billion in payments for gas delivered to Tehran.

Transportation

Railway 
It links Uzen in Kazakhstan with Bereket - Etrek in Turkmenistan and ends at Gorgan in Iran's Golestan province. In Iran, the railway will be linked to national network making its way to the ports of the Persian Gulf.

This project is part of the Ashgabat agreement, which is a Multimodal transport agreement signed by India, Oman, Iran, Turkmenistan, Uzbekistan and Kazakhstan, for creating an international transport and transit corridor facilitating transportation of goods between Central Asia and the Persian Gulf.

The project is estimated to cost $620m which is being jointly funded by the governments of Kazakhstan, Turkmenistan and Iran.The project also aims to create a multimodal transport system to provide seamless connectivity in the region for passenger travel as well.

Work in Turkmenistan commenced in Bereket in December 2007 and in Kazakhstan in July 2009.

A  section between Bereket and Buzhan in Turkmenistan is being financed by the Asian Development Bank (ADB). A  memorandum of understanding was signed between ADB and the Turkmenistan government in February 2010, for a $350m loan as a special fund for technical assistance. The project loan was for the installation of signalling and communication equipment on the ongoing railway line, procurement of equipment and maintenance facilities, consulting, and for the management and supervision of construction. The project also received a loan of $371.2m from the Islamic Development Bank in July 2010.

In May 2013, a  Bereket – Uzen section of the  North-South Railway Corridor was completed. 
Currently railway stations along the new railway are being constructed.

The Kazakhstan-Turkmenistan-Iran railway link will be officially inaugurated in October 2014.

Bereket city (Kazandzhik) is strategically important railway intersection of the Trans-Caspian Railway (Caspian Sea, Turkmenistan, Uzbekistan and eastern Kazakhstan) and North-South Transnational Railway. The city has a large locomotive repair depot and a modern passenger railway station.

See also
Treaty of Akhal
Iran-Turkmenistan border

References

 
Turkmenistan
Bilateral relations of Turkmenistan